Stefan Larsson (born 21 January 1983) is a retired Swedish footballer.

He normally played as a fullback, but was also used in a forward role.

He came on a free transfer to IF Elfsborg where he is planned to play as a left defender. Taking over the position from the retired footballer Johan Karlsson. Larssons biggest qualities are his quickness and passing skills.
He played for several matches as a winger in Kalmar FF with success. Season 2007/08 he scored his first goals in the Swedish Allsvenskan as a winger against Örebro SK. He scored two goals that match, both 1-0 and 3-0. The experience from his more offensive role made a great difference when he later played on the left back position as an offensive player.

Career
He started his career in Storfors FF and was picked up by the Swedish Superettan team Degerfors IF. After two good seasons played in Superettan he was bought by the Swedish first league team Kalmar FF, where he achieved his greatest success in his career by winning the Swedish cup 2007 and the following season the national championship title 2008, he also won the supercup 2009. He played the Europa League qualifications with Kalmar FF  season 2007/08 and 2010/11. The season 2009/2010 he played the Uefa Champions League qualifications with Kalmar FF, but lost in the first round against Debreceni VSC. He played 130 caps and scored 5 goals during his four years in Kalmar FF, he left the season 2010/11 for the fellow Swedish top team IF Elfsborg who had been top 4 for over six years in a row in the first league and played for several years in the Europa League. He is now led by the former Swedish U-21 national and Stabaek coach Jörgen Lennartsson who recently replaced Magnus Haglund in IF Elfsborg.

Titles
Allsvenskan champion: 2008, 2012
Svenska Cupen 2007
Supercupen 2009

Europa League Q
2007/08(Kalmar FF)
2010/11(Kalmar FF)
2012/13(IF Elfsborg)

Uefa Champions League Q
2009/10
2013/14

References

External links
Kalmar FF profile 
 

1983 births
Living people
People from Storfors Municipality
Swedish footballers
Allsvenskan players
Superettan players
Kalmar FF players
IF Elfsborg players
Degerfors IF players
Association football midfielders
Sportspeople from Värmland County